This is a list of the first women lawyer(s) and judge(s) in Colorado. It includes the year in which the women were admitted to practice law (in parentheses). Also included are women who achieved other distinctions such becoming the first in their state to graduate from law school or become a political figure.

Firsts in Colorado's history

Lawyers 

First females: Mary Sternberg Thomas and Josephine M. Luthe (1891) 
First female to practice before the U.S. District Court and the Colorado Court of Appeals: Mary Lathrop (1897) in 1898:
 First female (water lawyer): Vena Pointer (1926)
First Hispanic American female: Betty Ann Camunez (1972)
First Asian American female (Japanese descent): Mariko Tatsumoto Layton (1977)

State judges 

 First female: Ida L. Gregory in 1903 
 First female (district court): Irena Ingham in 1938
 First female (Colorado Court of Appeals: Aurel M. Kelly in 1974 
 First female (Chief Judge; Colorado Court of Appeals): Aurel M. Kelly in 1998 
 First female (Seventeenth Judicial District Court): Dorothy Binder (1956) in 1978 
 First female (Colorado Supreme Court): Jean Dubofsky (1967) in 1979 
 First African American female: Claudia Jordan (1980) in 1994 
 First Hispanic American female (Fourth Judicial District Court): Theresa M. Cisneros (1983) in 1997
 First female (Chief Justice; Colorado Supreme Court): Mary Mullarkey in 1998 
 First openly lesbian female: Mary A. Celeste in 2000 
 First Asian American female (Korean descent): Chelsea Malone
 First female (Fifth Judicial District): Karen Romeo in 2008  
First openly (Latino American) lesbian female (Colorado Supreme Court): Monica Márquez (1997) in 2010
First Asian American (female) (Colorado Appellate Court): Neeti Pawar in 2019

Federal judges 
First female (U.S. District Court for the District of Colorado): Zita Leeson Weinshienk in 1979: 
First Hispanic American female (U.S. District Court for the District of Colorado): Christine Arguello (1980) in 2008 
First Asian American (female) (U.S. District Court for the District of Colorado): Regina M. Rodriguez in 2021 
First openly lesbian female (U.S. District Court for the District of Colorado): Charlotte Sweeney in 2022

Attorney General of Colorado

 First female: Gale Norton (1978) from 1991-1999

Deputy Attorney General 

 First female: Marty Albright
 First Hispanic American (female) to serve as the Chief Deputy Attorney General: Christine Arguello (1980) in 2000

Assistant Attorney General 

 First female: Clara Ruth Mozzor in 1917

Deputy District Attorney 

 First female: Dorothy Binder (1956) in 1958

State Public Defender 

 First female: Megan Ring in 2018

Political Office 

 First openly lesbian female (Colorado House of Representatives): Jennifer Veiga (1988) from 1997-2003

Colorado Bar Association 

 First female (president): Kathryn Tamblyn in 1982

Firsts in local history
 Dorothy Binder (1956): First female district court judge in Adams and Bloomfield Counties, Colorado (1978)
 Cheryl Rowles-Stokes (1995): First African American Chief Deputy District Attorney in the 18th Judicial District Office of the District Attorney (2001-2012) and first African American female judge in Arapahoe County (2012).
 Marsha Baer Yeager: First female District Attorney and judge in Boulder County, Colorado
 Lolita Buckner Innis: First African American (female) to serve as the Dean of the University of Colorado Law School (2021)
 Karen Romeo: First female district court judge in Clear Creek, Eagle, Lake and Summit Counties, Colorado (2008)
 Mary Lathrop (1897): First female lawyer in Denver, Colorado [Denver County, Colorado]
Mary A. Pate: First female police judge in Denver, Colorado (1910)
Zita Weinshienk: First female judge in Denver County, Colorado
 Claudia Jordan (1980): First African American female judge appointed to the Denver County Court bench and the first in Colorado (1994).
Mary A. Celeste: First openly LGBT female judge appointed to the Denver County Court, Colorado (2000). She was also the first female (and openly LGBT female) to serve as the Presiding Judge of the Denver County Court (2008). 
Beth McCann: First female District Attorney for Denver, Colorado (2018) [Denver County, Colorado]
Nicole M. Rodarte: First woman of color (who is of Latino descent) to serve as Presiding Judge of the Denver County Court (2022)
 Grace Storey Merlo: First female to serve on the Twenty-Second Judicial Branch (1987) [Dolores and Montezuma Counties, Colorado]
 Irena Ella Sweet Ingham McGarry (c. 1920s): Reputed to be the first female lawyer in El Paso County, Colorado
 Marie Shelton Holloway: First female judge in Garfield County, Colorado (1948–1964)
 Ashley Burgemeister: First female judge in Gunnison County, Colorado
 Christine A. Carney: First female judge in Larimer County, Colorado (1998)
 Mary Beth Buescher: First female lawyer in Grand Junction, Colorado [Mesa County, Colorado]
 Mary Johnson: First female judge in Pitkin County, Colorado (c. 1960s)
 Carrie Clyde Holly: First woman attorney in Pueblo County
 Cynthia Mitchell: First female Pueblo County Attorney, Colorado (2017)

See also  

 List of first women lawyers and judges in the United States
 Timeline of women lawyers in the United States
 Women in law

Other topics of interest 

 List of first minority male lawyers and judges in the United States
 List of first minority male lawyers and judges in Colorado

References 

Lawyers, Colorado, first
Colorado, first
Women, Colorado, first
Women, Colorado, first
Women in Colorado
Lawyers and judges
Colorado lawyers